René Vincent Philippe Llense (14 July 1913 – 12 March 2014) was a French football goalkeeper, who played for FC Sète and AS Saint-Étienne during his club career. He was born in Collioure, Pyrénées-Orientales. He earned 11 caps for the France national football team from 1935 to 1939, and participated in the 1934 FIFA World Cup and the 1938 FIFA World Cup. He was their last surviving player to have participated in any of the pre-war World Cups. He turned 100 in July 2013 and died on 12 March 2014 from natural causes.

See also
 List of centenarians (sportspeople)

References

1913 births
2014 deaths
French centenarians
Men centenarians
Sportspeople from Pyrénées-Orientales
Association football goalkeepers
French footballers
France international footballers
1934 FIFA World Cup players
1938 FIFA World Cup players
FC Sète 34 players
AS Saint-Étienne players
Ligue 1 players
AS Béziers Hérault (football) managers
French football managers